In larger school systems, a head teacher principal is often assisted by someone known as a vice-principal, deputy principal, or assistant/associate principal. Unlike the principal, the vice-principal does not have quite the decision-making authority that the principal carries. Although they still carry nearly the same authority among students, vice-principals do not have the same power on the board. Experience as an assistant principal is often a prerequisite for advancement to a principalship.

Job description
Assistant principals aid the principal in the overall administration of the school. However, Deputy Principals are higher than Assistant Principals as it will be the DP (Deputy Principal)'s responsibility to step in in case of the Principal's: absence, illness, temporary leave or resignation to step forward as Principal.  Some assistant principals hold this position for several years to prepare for advancement to principal jobs; others are career assistant principals. They are primarily responsible for scheduling student classes, ordering textbooks and supplies, and coordinating transportation, custodial, cafeteria, and other support services. They usually handle student discipline and attendance problems, social and recreational programs, and health and safety matters. They also may counsel students on personal, educational, or vocational matters. With the advent of site-based management, assistant principals are playing a greater role in ensuring the academic success of students by helping to develop new curricula, evaluating teachers, and dealing with school-community relations—responsibilities previously assumed solely by the principal. The number of assistant principals that a school employs may vary, depending on the number of students.

Education
Most schools require elementary, middle, and high school principals to have a master's degree in education administration or leadership. Most principals also have experience as teachers. Master's degrees in educational administration are offered at a number of universities around the United States including the University of North Texas, Ball State University, Drexel University, Ashland University, Northeastern University, and the University of Scranton.

Duties
In American schools, it is often his or her duty to handle matters such as student discipline, parent conference meetings, asset inventory and ordering, school improvement planning, bus and lunch supervision, and teacher observations. Additionally, assistant principals frequently serve as testing coordinators, training staff on procedures related to standardized assessment, as well as accounting for testing materials. In addition to these duties, assistant principals are instructional leaders.

Most importantly however, if something happens to the principal, such as an extended leave of absence, then the assistant principal would act as the interim principal. Because of this, many see this position as a stepping-stone to the larger role of principal and is often used as such.  In most schools, the vice principal forgoes all teaching duties in order to address broader educational issues. However, in Canada, during an extended leave of absence of the principal, usually a retired principal will be assigned to a school by the school board/district to oversee the management of the school until the actual principal returns; thus, the roles and responsibilities of the Vice-Principal(s) will remain the same.  

In the United Kingdom, most secondary schools have Assistant Principals (or traditionally known as Assistant Headteachers), with the Vice-Principals (or traditionally known as Deputy Headteachers) managing them. Their duties vary from school to school; however, usually Assistant Principals and Vice-Principals support school initiatives in maintaining/overseeing standards, behavior, Key Stages 3–5, teaching and exam timetabling, inclusion, the curriculum and student learning, and overall accountability in the school. They can also carry out performance appraisals and lesson observations.  Furthermore, principals/head teachers/headmasters/headmistresses are beginning to have more autonomy on how they will structure their school's senior leadership team and what each member's role will be. These additional roles that are found in English secondary schools can lead to senior leadership/administrative teams to be as large as 8–12 people, depending on the school's size and its demographics (e.g., 1-2 Headteacher(s), 2–4 Deputy Headteachers, 3–8 Assistant Headteachers). In contrast to the US and Canada, most Assistant Headteachers and/or Deputy Headteachers teach 1–2 courses on top of their administrative duties.

See also
 Dean (education)

References

External links
 Infusing Management Tasks with Instructional Leadership by Dr. Angie McQuaig, Assistant Principal
 US Department of Labor Bureau of Labor Statistics
 The National Association of Elementary School Principals, 1615 Duke St., Alexandria, VA 22314-3483
 The National Association of Secondary School Principals, 1904 Association Drive, Reston, VA 20191-1537

Education and training occupations
Educational administration
Principal